Vandanmedu  is a village in Idukki district in the Indian state of Kerala.

Vandanmedu is the biggest cardamom plantation in India.

Demographics
 India census, Vandanmedu had a population of 10009 with 5017 males and 4993 females.

Religion

Various sections of Christianity, Hinduism and Muslim co-exist harmoniously. Hindu community Ezhava, Nair, Viswakarma and others. Nair community has a strong population. Christians, mainly Catholic, Pentecostal, Anglicans live there.

References

Villages in Idukki district